Lope Fitero (died 10 Jun 1245) was a Roman Catholic prelate who served as Bishop of Córdoba (1237–1245).

Biography
In 1237, Lope Fitero was appointed by Pope Gregory IX as Bishop of Córdoba. On 9 May 1237, he was consecrated bishop by Juan Domínguez de Medina, Bishop of Burgos. He served as Bishop of Córdoba until his death on 10 Jun 1245.

References

External links and additional sources
 (for Chronology of Bishops)
 (for Chronology of Bishops)

1245 deaths
13th-century Roman Catholic bishops in Castile
Bishops appointed by Pope Gregory IX